The Media Club of Canada was a professional organization of Canadian journalists, active from 1904 to the early 1990s. Founded as the Canadian Women's Press Club and open only to women, early members of the group included Kit Coleman, Nellie McClung, Emily Murphy and Helen MacGill.

The organization adopted the Media Club of Canada name in 1971 when it opened its membership to men as well.

The organization's activities included an annual awards presentation for the best work in journalism by its members.

Non-fiction author Erna Paris produced a radio documentary on their work.

External links
 Media Club of Canada

Canadian journalism organizations